The International Islamic Federation of Student Organizations (IIFSO) is an international student and youth federation with a membership rate of about 100 student and youth organizations in more than 60 countries. IIFSO started as a student initiative in Ibadan university in Nigeria in 1966, and was formally established in Aachen, Germany in 1969.

IIFSO's mission is to "serve, develop, integrate, and represent the Islamic student organizations worldwide while building bridges with other cultures in order to participate in building a brighter future for Muslim youth".

The IIFSO publishes and distributes large quantities of pocket editions of books on Islam.
It published more than 1000 books in more than 100 languages to spread Islamic and humanitarian values and promote youth engagement. It also organized hundreds of capacity-building trainings to youth activists everywhere. IIFSO participated in several conferences in topics such as human rights, islamophobia, women rights, terrorism, social development, etc.

Notes

References
Oxford Islamic Studies Online

External links
 

Islamic organisations based in Germany
Islamic publishing companies
Muslim Brotherhood
Student religious organisations in Germany
International student religious organizations
Student organizations established in 1969